Trochoidea may refer to:

 Trochoidea (genus), a genus of land snails
 Trochoidea (superfamily), a superfamily of marine snails